Delwar Jahan Jhantu is a Bangladeshi film director, producer, lyricist, composer, screenwriter, story-writer, editor, cinematographer, music director and a freedom fighter. He made his directorial debut with the film Leader, he also produced it. His first directorial released was Bonduk, and it was released on 1978.  he has directed 75 films in more than four decades of his career, which is the highest directorial venture of any single director in Bangladeshi film and has written screenplays for more than 350 films. He won the National Film Awards as Best screenplay for the film Goriber Raja. His 2021 directorial venture Tumi Acho Tumi Nei, starring Asif Imrose and Prarthana Fardin Dighi was a box office bomb.

Films 
 Leader
 Baanduk (1979)
 Omar Sharif (1980)
 Salim Javed (1981)
 Al Helal (1982) 
 Nagrani (1983)
 Mohal (1984)
 Jhinuk Mala (1985)
 Mujahid (1985)
 Matir Koley (1986)
 Shashi Punnu (1987)
 Sukh Shanti (1987)
 Hati Amar Sathi (1987)
 Paribar (1987)
 Aomor (1988)
 Kohinur (1988)
 Bhai Amar Bhai (1988)
 Ghar Bari (1989)
 Shimul Parul (1990)
 Jadrel Bou (1990)
 Dukhini Ma (1990)
 Palki (1990)
 Stirir Shopno (1991)
 Nache Nagin (1991)
 Nisshartha (1991)
 Bhabir Songshar (1991)
 Rupashi Nagin (1992) 
 Sukh Shanti Naginir Prem (1992)
 Shanti Ashanti (1992)
 Gariber Bandhu (1992)
 Bhaier Ador (1993)
 Ruper Rani Ganer Raja (1993)
 Satta Badi (1993)
 Nach Nagina Nach (1993)
 Jalimer Dushman (1993)
 Prem Geet (1993)
 Judge Barrister (1994)
 Dakat (1994)
 Deshi Rangbaz (1994)
 Kanya Dan (1995)
 Chakrani (1995)
 Buker Dhon (1995)
 Rag Anurag (1995) 
 Bir Bahadur (1995)
 Harano Prem (1996)
 Bagha Baghini (1996)
 Gariber Songshar (1996)
 Fashir Ashami (1996)
 Bish Bachar Por (1997)
 Five Rifles (1997)
 Nil Sagorer Tirey (1997)
 Prem (1997)
 Jol Dosshu (1997)
 Raja Bangladeshi (1998) 
 Gariber Raja Robin Hood (1999)
 Bishe Bhora Nagin (2000) 
 Dui Nagin (2001)
 Bap Betir Judho (2001)
 Bir Soinik (2003)
 Bijli Toofan (2004)
 Circus Kanya (2004)
 Nach Ruposhi (2005)
 Bokul Phooler Mala (2006)
 Sobai To Bhalobasha Chay (2009) 
 Sathi Hara Nagin (2011)
 Headmaster (2014)
 Epar Opar (2015)
 Akash Mahal (2019)
 Tumi Acho Tumi Nei (2021)
 Sujon Majhi 
 Bou

story, screenplay, dialogue and lyrics
 Moheshkhalir Bakhe (1978) - (story and lyricist)
 Shishnaag (1979) - (story)
 Shobuj Sathi (1982) - (story)
 Nazma (1983) - (story)
 Laily Majnu (1983) - (lyricist)
 Sokal-Sondha (1984) - story
 Jadu Nogor - (story)
 Protihingsha - (story and dialogue)
 Alif Laila: Aladiner Aschorjo Prodip  - (story, screenplay, dialogue, lyrics)
 Nishpap (1986) - (story, screenplay)
 Obodan (1988) - (story)
 Bouma (1989) - (story)
 Bhaijaan' (1989) - (story, screenplay)
 Dhon Rotno (1990) - (story and screenplay)
 Mayer Doa (1990) - (story)
 Nache Nagin (1991) - (story)
 Mayer Ashirbaad (1993) - (story)
 Nag Naginir Prem (1993) - (story)
 Prem Geet (1993) - (story, screenplay, dialogue, lyricist)
 Kanyadan (1995) - (story, screenplay, dialogue, lyrics)
 Boner Raja Tarzan (1995) - (story)
 Jhinuk Mala (1996) - (story)
 Nishthur (1996) - (story, screenplay, dialogue and lyrics)
 Five Rifles (1997) - (story, screenplay, dialogue, lyricist)
 Gotiber Ostad (1997) - (story, screenplay) 
 Shoktir Lorai (1997) - (story, screenplay, dialogue) 
 Sobar Upore Maa (1997) - (story)
 Shimul Parul (1998) - (story)
 Gariber Samman (1999) - (story)
 Shotru Dhongsho (1999) - (story) 
 Bou Shashurir Juddho (2003) - (story)
 Bir Soinik (2003) - (story, dialogue, screenplay)
 Action Lady (2005) - (lyricist)
 Bidrohi Salahuddin (2006) - (story)
 Bakul Phuler Mala (2007) - (screenplay, dialogue)
 Banglar King Kong (2010) - (story)
 Judge Barrister Police Commissioner (2013) - (story)
 Shiri Forhad'' (2013) - (story)

References

External links 
 
 

Bangladeshi film directors
People from Chittagong
Living people
Year of birth missing (living people)